New Burnside is a village in Johnson County, Illinois, United States. The population was 211 at the 2010 census.

History

In 1878, New Burnside peaked in population at 1,200 when the railroad ran through the middle of the town. The population decreased gradually after the railroad was abandoned. More recently, the Tunnel Hill State Trail for bicycles was built along the abandoned line. The village was founded in 1872, and was a Cairo and Vincennes Railroad boom-town. Much of its founding was based on the same coal mining industry that grew Harrisburg and Carrier Mills, but slowly turned to an orchard-based economy by 1900. It was named after Civil War general Ambrose Burnside.

Geography
New Burnside is located in northeastern Johnson County  at  (37.579166, -88.771983). U.S. Route 45 passes through the east side of the village, leading northeast  to Harrisburg and southwest  to Vienna, the Johnson county seat. Illinois Route 166 has its southern terminus at US-45 and leads through the north side of the village.

The village is east of the junction of Interstates 24 and 57.

Demographics

As of the census of 2000, there were 242 people, 95 households, and 70 families residing in the village. The racial makeup of the village was 99.59% White and 0.41% Native American. Hispanic or Latino of any race were 0.83% of the population.

There were 95 households, out of which 31.6% had children under the age of 18 living with them, 61.1% were married couples living together, 9.5% had a female householder with no husband present, and 25.3% were non-families. 22.1% of all households were made up of individuals, and 12.6% had someone living alone who was 65 years of age or older.  The average household size was 2.55 and the average family size was 2.96.

In the village, the population was spread out, with 23.1% under the age of 18, 12.4% from 18 to 24, 26.0% from 25 to 44, 24.8% from 45 to 64, and 13.6% who were 65 years of age or older.  The median age was 34 years. For every 100 females there were 100.0 males.  For every 100 females age 18 and over, there were 93.8 males.

The median income for a household in the village was $31,591, and the median income for a family was $32,273. Males had a median income of $25,833 versus $12,813 for females. The per capita income for the village was $12,709.  About 15.4% of families and 15.4% of the population were below the poverty line, including 18.8% of those under the age of eighteen and none of those 65 or over.

References

Villages in Johnson County, Illinois